Her Dad the Constable is a 1911 silent short film romance directed by R. F. Baker(Richard Foster Baker) and starring Francis X. Bushman.
Released as a split-reel with God's Inn by the Sea.

Cast
Francis X. Bushman
Harry Cashman
Dorothy Phillips

See also
Francis X. Bushman filmography

References

External links
  Her Dad the Constable at IMDb.com

1911 films
1911 short films
American silent short films
Essanay Studios films
American black-and-white films
American romance films
1910s romance films
1910s American films